Jérémie Lararaudeuse (born 31 March 2001) is a Mauritian hurdler. He competed in the 2020 Summer Olympics.

References

External links
 

2001 births
Living people
Athletes (track and field) at the 2020 Summer Olympics
Mauritian male hurdlers
Olympic athletes of Mauritius
African Games competitors for Mauritius
Athletes (track and field) at the 2019 African Games
Athletes (track and field) at the 2018 African Youth Games